Woodberry may refer to:

Places 
 Woodberry, New South Wales, a suburb in Australia
 Woodberry, Baltimore, a neighborhood in the United States
 Woodberry Down, a district of North London, England

Other uses 
 Woodberry (surname)
 Woodberry (Baltimore Light Rail station), in the United States
 Woodberry Glacier, in Antarctica
 Woodberry Nunataks, in Antarctica

See also 
 Woodberry Forest School, in Woodberry Forest, Madison County, Virginia, in the United States
 Woodberry Down School, in the Manor House area of North London, England
 Woodberry-Quarrels House, a historic house in Hamilton, Massachusetts in the United States